The British Independent Film Awards 2019 were held on 1 December 2019 to recognise the best in British independent cinema and filmmaking talent from United Kingdom. The nominations were announced on 30 October 2019. The Personal History of David Copperfield led the nominations with 11, followed by Wild Rose with 10.

Winners and nominees

Films with multiple nominations and awards

References

External links
Official website

2019 film awards
British Independent Film Awards